Camorra (A Story of Streets, Women and Crime) is a 1986 Italian crime film directed by Lina Wertmüller. It was entered into the 36th Berlin International Film Festival.

Plot
Hostel owner Annunziata (Ángela Molina) is attacked, but before her assailant can sexually assault her, the man is killed. The killer plunges a hypodermic needle into one of the rapist's testicles and escapes before Annunziata is able to identify him. This soon becomes the signature of a serial killer who appears to be targeting drug dealers.

Cast
 Ángela Molina as Annunziata
 Harvey Keitel as Frankie
 Isa Danieli as Carmela
 Paolo Bonacelli as Tango
 Elvio Porta
 Vittorio Squillante as Tony
 Muzzi Loffredo
 Mario Scarpetta
 Tommaso Bianco as Baba
 Raffaele Verita
 Franco Angrisano
 Sebastiano Nardone
 Pino Ammendola as O' Dimonio
 Anny Papa as (as Anni Papa)
 Francisco Rabal as Guaglione
 Daniel Ezralow as "Toto"
 Lorraine Bracco (uncredited)

References

External links

1986 films
1986 crime drama films
1980s serial killer films
Italian crime drama films
1980s Italian-language films
Films directed by Lina Wertmüller
Films about the Camorra
Golan-Globus films
Films produced by Menahem Golan
Films produced by Yoram Globus
1980s Italian films